Ungut County is in Ardabil province, Iran. The capital of the county is the city of Tazeh Kand-e Angut. At the 2006 census, the region's population (as Angut District of Germi County) was 27,494 in 5,626 households. The following census in 2011 counted 22,606 in 5,485 households. At the 2016 census, the county's population was 20,335 in 5,738 households. It was separated from Germi County in December 2020.

Administrative divisions

The population history of Ungut County's administrative divisions (as parts of Germi County) over three consecutive censuses is shown in the following table.

After Ungut County was established, the following administrative divisions were created:

References

Counties of Ardabil Province